Strikes and lockouts may refer to:

Lockout (industry), work stoppage initiated by an employer
Strike action, work stoppage initiated by the employees